The Brunei Darussalam Government Gazette is the official publication of the Government of Brunei and publishes laws, ordinances and other regulations.

See also 

 List of government gazettes

References

External links 

 

Government of Brunei